The 1973 Miami Dolphins season was the franchise's eighth season and fourth season in the National Football League (NFL). The team entered the 1973 season as defending Super Bowl champion following its perfect undefeated 1972 season.

In week 1, the Dolphins extended their winning streak to 18 with a 21–13 win over the San Francisco 49ers. However, the following week, they were defeated 12–7 by the Oakland Raiders to end the winning streak. The streak stood as an NFL record until it was broken by the New England Patriots in 2004 whose record of 21 consecutive wins still stands.

The team won the AFC East, finishing with a regular season record of 12–2, and then defeated the Cincinnati Bengals in the Divisional Round, the Raiders in the AFC Championship game, and the Minnesota Vikings in the league’s eighth Super Bowl. It was the Dolphins' second consecutive (and to date last) Super Bowl victory. With the Dolphins' combined records of 17–0 and 15–2 over the course of their 1972 and 1973 seasons, the Dolphins posted a 32–2 total record over 2 years, for a winning percentage of .941. The Dolphins allowed just 10.7 points per game in the regular season, a franchise record still standing today.

The last remaining active member of the 1973 Miami Dolphins was offensive lineman Ed Newman, who retired after the 1984 season, right after making it to Super Bowl XIX as a member of, coincidentally, the Dolphins.

Season summary 
Although the Dolphins were unable to match their 17–0 perfect season of 1972, many sports writers, fans, and Dolphins players themselves felt that the 1973 team was better. While the 1972 team faced no competition in the regular season that had a record of better than 8-6, the 1973 team played against a much tougher schedule that included games against the Oakland Raiders, Pittsburgh Steelers, and Dallas Cowboys (all playoff teams), plus two games against a resurgent Bills squad that featured 2,000-yard rusher O. J. Simpson. Miami finished with a 12–2 regular season, including their opening game victory over the San Francisco 49ers that tied an NFL record with eighteen consecutive wins. The Dolphins’ streak ended in week two with a 12–7 loss to the Raiders in Berkeley, California.

Just like the two previous seasons, Miami’s offense relied primarily on their rushing attack. Fullback Larry Csonka recorded his third consecutive 1,000 rushing yard season (1,003 yards), while running back Mercury Morris rushed for 954 yards and scored 10 touchdowns, while leading the league with 6.4 yards per carry. Running back Jim Kiick was also a key contributor, rushing for 257 yards, and catching 27 passes for 208 yards. Quarterback Bob Griese, the AFC's second leading passer, completed only 116 passes for 1,422 yards, but threw about twice as many touchdown passes (17) as interceptions (8), and earned an 84.3 passer rating. Wide receiver Paul Warfield remained the main deep threat on the team, catching 29 passes for 514 yards and 11 touchdowns. The offensive line remained strong led by center Jim Langer and right guard Larry Little. Griese, Csonka, Warfield, Langer, and Little would all eventually be elected to the Pro Football Hall of Fame.

Miami’s “No Name Defense” continued to dominate their opponents. Future Hall of Fame linebacker Nick Buoniconti recovered three fumbles and returned one for a touchdown. Safety Dick Anderson led the team with eight interceptions, which he returned for 163 yards and two touchdowns. And safety Jake Scott, the previous season's Super Bowl MVP, had four interceptions and 71 return yards. The Dolphins were still using their “53” defense devised at the beginning of the 1972 season, where Bob Matheson (#53) would be brought in as a fourth linebacker in a 3–4 defense, with Manny Fernandez at nose tackle. Matheson could either rush the quarterback or drop back into coverage.

In 2007, ESPN.com ranked the 1973 Dolphins as the eight-greatest defense in NFL history, noting that the team “held 11 opponents to 14 points or less, setting a record by allowing just 150 points in a 14-game season”. Defensive end Bill Stanfill set a Dolphins’ sack record that still stands, with 18.5. In the playoffs and Super Bowl, they allowed only 33 points against Cincinnati, Oakland and Minnesota. Stanfill, Manny Fernandez, Hall of Fame middle linebacker Nick Buoniconti, and safeties Dick Anderson (AP Defensive Player of the Year) and Jake Scott were all named to the 1973 All-Pro team. They also held record-breaking rusher O. J. Simpson to his lowest total yardage of the season, a mere 55 yards in Week Six.

Offseason

Draft

Personnel

Staff

Roster

Preseason

Regular season

Schedule 

Note: Intra-division opponents are in bold text.

Game summaries

Week 1

Week 2 at Raiders 

The Raiders became the first team to defeat Miami since Super Bowl VI. The game was played at Memorial Stadium in Berkeley due to a scheduling conflict at Oakland–Alameda County Coliseum with the A's.

Week 4

Week 6

Miami took over first place in the AFC East by halting Simpson's streak of consecutive 100-yard performances.  They held him to 55 yards on 14 carries before he left the game with an ankle sprain in the fourth quarter.  Miami posted a 21-point second quarter highlighted by a pair of touchdown passes from Bob Griese to Jim Mandich.  The Bills made no first downs in the first half.  Leypoldt and Garo Yepremian opened and closed the scoring by swapping field goals.  The Dolphins' other touchdown came when a 21-yard Paul Warfield reception set up a Mercury Morris 4-yard touchdown.

Week 8

Week 10

The Dolphins clinched the East Division title with a 17–0 shutout of the Bills.  Miami's first touchdown drive included two fourth-and-one conversions by Jim Kiick.  With Miami leading 10–0, Buffalo drove from their own 20-yard-line to the Dolphins' 4-yard-line and then turned the ball over on downs four plays later at the 1-yard-line.  In the game, the Bills were shut out despite a pair of 100-yard rushing efforts by Simpson and Braxton who posted 120 and 119 yards respectively.

Week 12

Week 14

Standings

Postseason

Divisional 

The Dolphins outgained Cincinnati in total yards, 400–194, and first downs, 27–11, while also scoring on three of their first four possessions and shutting out the Bengals in the second half. The Dolphins racked up 241 yards on the ground, including 106 from Mercury Morris and 71 from Larry Csonka, while receiver Paul Warfield caught 5 passes for 95 yards and a score.

Conference Championship 

Running back Larry Csonka led the Dolphins to a victory with 117 rushing yards and 3 touchdowns. Mercury Morris also ran for 86 yards. Bob Griese threw just six passes during the game, completing three.

Super Bowl 

Larry Csonka rushed for 145 yards on 33 carries, scoring two touchdowns, and was named MVP. Bob Griese threw just seven passes all game, completing six.

Awards and honors 
 Larry Csonka, Super Bowl Most Valuable Player

Pro Bowl Selections (voted by NFL coaches for players other than their own):

Offense:

 Bob Griese, Quarterback

 Jim Langer, Offensive Line (Center)

 Larry Little, Offensive Line (Guard)

 Wayne Moore, Offensive Line (Tackle)

 Larry Csonka, Running Back

 Mercury Morris, Running Back

 Paul Warfield, Wide Receiver

 Garo Yepremian, Place Kicker

Defense:

 Bill Stanfill, Defensive End

 Nick Buoniconti, Middle Linebacker

 Dick Anderson, Safety

 Jake Scott, Safety

Notes and references

External links 
 1973 Miami Dolphins at Pro-Football-Reference.com

Miami
Miami Dolphins seasons
AFC East championship seasons
American Football Conference championship seasons
Super Bowl champion seasons
Miami Dolphins